It is the eleventh studio album by American musician Alan Vega. It was released in July 2017 under the Fader Label. The album was recorded between 2010 and 2016 with Alan Vega's wife Liz Lamere, before his death in July 2016.

Track listing

References

2017 albums
Alan Vega albums
Albums published posthumously